Caleb Kiner (born September 20, 2002), is an American soccer player who plays as a defender for Portland Timbers 2 via the Portland Timbers academy.

Club career
After playing with the Portland Timbers academy, Kiner made appearances for Portland's USL League Two side Portland Timbers U23 in 2019, as well as their professional USL Championship side Portland Timbers 2.

References

External links
 

2002 births
Living people
Association football defenders
American soccer players
People from Dallas, Oregon
Portland Timbers U23s players
Portland Timbers 2 players
Soccer players from Oregon
USL League Two players
USL Championship players
Gonzaga Bulldogs men's soccer players